Big Badja Hill, or Big Badga Mountain, a mountain on the Great Dividing Range, is located in the Southern Tablelands region of New South Wales, Australia,  north-east of Cooma.

Plants found nearby are the Big Badja Gum and Kunzea badjaensis, a small myrtle with heads of white flowers on the ends of the branches.

See also

 List of mountains in New South Wales

References

Big Badja
Southern Tablelands